Weatherstripping is the process of sealing openings such as doors, windows, and trunks from the waters above. The term can also refer to the materials used to carry out such sealing processes. The goal of weatherstripping is to prevent rain and water from entering entirely or partially and accomplishes this by either returning or rerouting water. A secondary goal of weatherstripping is to keep interior air in, thus saving energy on heating and air conditioning.

Automotive

Purpose
Automotive weatherstripping is used extensively aboard automobiles, and can be found anywhere the interior compartment must be sealed from the environment. It must be functional and cohesive with the body design of the vehicle. In addition to factors standard to weatherstripping, additional factors must be considered for vehicles, specifically in the engineering of the parts. For example, the weatherstripping must function the same while the vehicle is parked and at full speed; be flexible to accommodate motion vibrations; endure extreme temperatures of hot and cold; withstand long periods of sun exposure; and resist automotive liquids such as oil, gasoline, and windshield washer fluid (methanol). Weatherstripping also plays a part in maintaining satisfactory ride quality in the vehicle, being partially responsible for sealing noise out from the passenger compartment.

Automobile flex when going over bumps, and vibrations cause relative motions between the relatively fixed body and movable parts like doors, windows, and sunroofs. This movement could allow water in the vehicle so the weatherstrip must compensate by filling the gap. Furthermore, this relative movement can cause noises such as squeaks, rattles, and creaks to be heard within the vehicle.

Automotive weatherstripping can fail because of age or use.
Poorly performing weatherstripping should be reported to the car dealership if the vehicle is under warranty, as fixes may be known.

Materials
Automotive weatherstripping is commonly made of EPDM rubber, a thermoplastic elastomer (TPE) mix of plastic and rubber, and a thermoplastic olefin (TPO) polymer/filler blend. Sunroof weatherstripping can also be made from silicone due to the extreme heat encountered by automobile roofs.

The efficacy of weatherstripping can be significantly increased by specialty coatings during manufacture. Coatings for weatherstripping must adhere to all of these weatherstrip materials. Like other paints and coatings, a large variety of weatherstrip coatings are commonly available, with a large variety of coating performances. Fiber texture, type and density can be adjusted to provide superior sealing without impacting resistance to movement, rotational friction or fit. Silicone is the most difficult to adhere to, but at least one coating is commercially available. After bonding to the weatherstrip, these coatings provide chemical and ultraviolet resistance, decrease the static coefficient of friction (thereby reducing the force required to open or close doors), and reduce or eliminate noise. In vehicles without coated weatherstripping, the weatherstripping is much more likely to cause the above-mentioned issues along with others such as rust following premature failure of the paint. That some cars have non-coated weatherstripping is surprising, given that the cost of the coating is less than US$1 to US$3 per vehicle, whereas the rubber and steel is tens of dollars; an entire car set of weatherstripping may be worth US$100 to US$300 in the total cost of the vehicle, which includes all labor and costs of the manufacturing equipment.

Buildings

Overview
Weatherstripping around openings – especially doors and windows – is used in buildings to keep out weather, increase interior comfort, lower utility bills, and reduce noise. Builder weatherstripping can be made from felt; vinyl, rubber, or poly foam; EPDM cellular rubber and vinyl tubing; and metals such as brass and aluminum.

Doors
Every exterior door, or door to an uninsulated room such as an attic, must be weatherstripped as required by building codes in various jurisdictions. The materials used in door weatherstripping are thresholds, a piece of material (either a sweep or a J-hook) to match the door to the threshold, and the actual weatherstripping itself. Doors can usually be divided into private homes and commercial properties. Some of these doors receive custom weatherstripping at the factory.

Pre-weatherstripped doors for private homes are usually made of fiberglass or a similar material and are shipped from the factory weatherstripped. The doors have a kerf in the door stop so that a foam, rubber, or vinyl strip can be placed inside for the door to rest against when closed. These doors also have the threshold — usually a molded piece of plastic — nailed to the frame in the factory. These units are not difficult to install and require only very little skill.

Custom weatherstripping, compared to pre-weatherstripped units, requires much more time and is considered to be a specialized skill. Weatherstrippers install a threshold, cut the door and install a sweep or J-hook to the bottom of the door, and nail spring-steel bronze into the doorjamb to seal the gap.

Door weatherstripping is critical for thermal comfort and the overall energy efficiency of any building, particularly in Zero Energy and Passive House building projects for cold climates. Doors should meet very high airtight standards to reduce air leakage to a minimum.

Low-energy buildings require special doors with special weatherstripping standards, based on the alignment of the threshold and jamb gasketing, multiple weatherstripping, and special seals - including special silicone or synthetic rubber seals, but also compression and steel magnetic weatherstrips.

Windows
Weatherstripping can be used on windows to seal them on all sides. Metal caps on the window top and on sashes redirect rain to drip off instead of infiltrating. Foam or gasket weatherstripping can be applied to the sides and sashes.

Other uses
Weatherstripping is also used on boats, to seal passenger and cargo areas from the elements.

References

Building engineering
Car windows